is the third Japanese single by the South Korean boy band Big Bang released under YG Entertainment and Universal Music Japan seven months after their "ガラガラ GO!!" ("Gara Gara Go!!") single. It is also the soundtrack for the TBS drama おひとりさま ("Ohitorisama").

The song was certified gold as a digital download to cellphones by the RIAJ in April 2011, a year and a half after its release.

Track listing

Release history

References

External links
 
 Big Bang Official Website
 Big Bang Japan Official Website
Big Bang by Universal Music Japan

BigBang (South Korean band) songs
2009 singles
YG Entertainment singles
Universal Music Japan singles
Japanese-language songs
2009 songs